Chem Snguon is the former minister of justice for Cambodia. In 1993 he was a member of the Constitution Drafting Committee.

References

Living people
Year of birth missing (living people)
Cambodian politicians
Government ministers of Cambodia